The Cauca River is a river in Colombia that lies between the Occidental and Central cordilleras. From its headwaters in southwestern Colombia near the city of Popayán, it joins the Magdalena River near Magangue in Bolivar Department, and the combined river eventually flows out into the Caribbean Sea.

Environmental issues
On November 18, 2007, Colombian newspaper El Tiempo reported that the river was receiving an average of 500 tons of residual waste a day. Pollution from the city of Popayán, seven gold mines that also add industrial pollutants such as mercury, some 8 sand mills, plus a couple of mines of coal and bauxite. Cali, the largest city on the river, depends on the river in a 76 percent. Adding to these other affluent rivers collect residual waters from other major cities and deposit an approximate of 330 tons of residual waste into the river.  By the time it gets to Yumbo the river has no oxygen.

The Hidroituango energy dam project has seriously affected the Cauca River. The dam has decreased its flow in some parts, up to 80%.

References

External links
 Corporación Regional del Cauca
 Corporación Autonoma Regional del Valle del Cauca

Rivers of Colombia
Magdalena River